Benjamin Saunders Steiner (July 28, 1921 – October 27, 1988) was an American professional baseball player.

In a three-season career, Steiner was a .256 hitter (79-for-308) with three home runs and 20 RBI in 82 games, including 41 runs, eight doubles, three triples, 10 stolen bases, and a .326 on-base percentage.

In the 1970s he served as the assistant county clerk of Middlesex County, New Jersey, and wore his ring from the 1950 Junior World Series, in which his Columbus Red Birds, champions of the American Association, defeated the Baltimore Orioles, champions of the International League.

Steiner died in Venice, Florida, at the age of 67.

External links

Retrosheet

1921 births
1988 deaths
Atlanta Crackers players
Baseball players from Virginia
Boston Red Sox players
Canton Terriers players
Columbus Red Birds players
Detroit Tigers players
Greensboro Red Sox players
Houston Buffaloes players
Louisville Colonels (minor league) players
Major League Baseball second basemen
Sportspeople from Alexandria, Virginia
People from Middlesex County, New Jersey
Scranton Red Sox players
Toronto Maple Leafs (International League) players